Berliner Schnauzen is a German docu-soap covering life in Berlin Zoo, aired on ZDF since 6 March 2006.

See also
List of German television series

External links
 

ZDF original programming
Television series about animals
Television shows set in Berlin
Berlin Zoological Garden
2006 German television series debuts
2006 German television series endings
German documentary television series
German-language television shows